GOCA can refer to the following:

 Gallery of Contemporary Art is the name of multiple fine art galleries
 Georgia Ovarian Cancer Alliance, an Atlanta-based group promoting Ovarian cancer awareness among women
 Gigabit over Coax Access, a network technology based on the Multimedia over Coax Alliance standard
 Global Offset and Countertrade Association, a Washington D. C. non-profit organization to promote world trade
 Global Outreach Charter Academy is a school in Jacksonville, Florida
 GPS-based online Control and Alarm System is a system for monitoring movement in three dimensions, developed by the Karlsruhe Institute of Technology
 Graphics Object Content Architecture, a format for vector-graphics objects in MODCA
 Greater Olney Civic Association, an umbrella civic association for Olney, Maryland
 Guaranteed Organic Certification Agency, USDA-accredited organic certification organization

Goca may refer to:

 Goca (nickname)